Nachiappan Chockalingam, professionally known as Nachi Chockalingam is a British scientist, academic practitioner and expert in Clinical Biomechanics. He is a professor at Staffordshire University and a Fellow of the Institute of Physics and Engineering in Medicine and has been appointed to a panel of experts for the Research Excellence Framework. Between 2016 and 2022, he has contributed to the NIHR Research for Patient Benefit Panel and serves in multiple other review panels of global grant awarding bodies including the EPSRC, MRC and the European Commission. He contributed to development of podiatric biomechanics in the UK and played a pivotal role in the establishment of the journals such as the Footwear Science and is on the editorial panel for a number of scientific and clinical journals.

Education 
Chockalingam holds a BEng in Electronics and Instrumentation Engineering from Annamalai University, India. In 1990, he obtained an MSc in Biomedical Engineering Science from Dundee University before proceeding to Staffordshire University where he completed a PhD in Clinical Biomechanics. His doctoral research investigated the biomechanics of scoliosis.

Career and research 
Chockalingam has international recognition in work across science, technology, engineering and medicine and has contributed extensively to synthesising scientific and clinical evidence. He has experience in the academic, industrial and clinical sectors through his collaboration with external partners in commercial consultancy, international policy and non-governmental organisations. Whilst playing a substantial role in establishing research and academic governance procedures including the establishment of research ethics policy at Staffordshire University, Chockalingam has set up the Centre for Biomechanics and Rehabilitation Technologies. He reached the position of the most senior professor at Staffordshire University and established the current version of the Staffordshire University Professoriate and led it between 2013 and 2020.

Chockalingam has made extensive academic contributions to understanding adolescent idiopathic scoliosis. He is a founding member of the Diabetic Foot Research Group and a visiting professor at the University of Malta. He also has visiting positions in other academic institutions in the United Kingdom, India and China. Chockalingam has contributed to the development of a culturally competent model of diabetic foot screening at the primary healthcare level and has made important contributions to the identification of priority areas for diabetic foot screening and the provision of rehabilitation and assistive technology. His current work focuses on policy areas related to Allied Health Professionals and telehealth. Recently, he was involved in the launching of a new policy brief to guide the creation of telehealth patient consultation guidelines and training for AHPs.  Chockalingam contributes to the developmental work on the provision of assistive technology in the ‘Global South’  and continues to raise awareness on health inequalities and cultural competency in health screening.

At a national level, for REF2021, Chockalingam has been appointed to the Panel of Experts within Subpanel 24 - Sport and Exercise Sciences, Leisure and Tourism. He is also listed as an expert to the European Parliament in policy areas relating to the assessment of new and emerging technologies, and foresight on long-term scientific and technological trends. He is a trustee for Age UK Staffordshire, Bionic Charity and recently Human Study AV. He was involved in the development of a Field Ventilator in response to the COVID-19 pandemic.

Awards and recognition 
As a Freeman of the City of London, he is involved with the activities of the Worshipful Company of Engineers. He was presented with a Lord Mayor’s COVID-19 Livery Award for his work on the innovative Field Ventilator project.

Publications 
Chockalingam has numerous scholarly outputs which include peer-reviewed papers, published abstracts and book chapters, invited and keynote presentations at international conferences, national and regional meetings.

References 

Living people
British scientists
Fellows of the Institute of Physics and Engineering in Medicine
Academics of Staffordshire University
Academic journal editors
Annamalai University alumni
Alumni of the University of Dundee
Year of birth missing (living people)